Twin City Radio is a public radio station in Sekondi-Takoradi, the capital town of the Western of Ghana. The station is owned and run by the state broadcaster - the Ghana Broadcasting Corporation.

References

Radio stations in Ghana
Western Region (Ghana)
Mass media in Sekondi-Takoradi